Dorothy Dale Kloss (born October 27, 1923) is an American dancer.

Life

Kloss began dancing when she was three years old. While working with a young Bob Fosse in a Chicago class, she won a tap dance contest and soon gained her own act at the Empire Room in Chicago. She toured the country and played Mexico City with actor Cantinflas.

She toured with Eddy Duchin until his orchestra was drafted during World War II, and then performed for the USO. In 1946 she became the hostess and dance instructor of television shows, broadcasting out of Chicago on WBKB.

She has performed with Liberace, The Mills Brothers, Mel Tormé, Harry Richman, Howard Keel, Kay Starr, Frankie Laine, and Chico Marx. She was accompanied by such bands as Ray Noble, Skinnay Ennis, Shep Fields and his “Rippling Rhythm,” to name a few.

Kloss performed at the Plaza Theatre in Palm Springs, California, with The Fabulous Palm Springs Follies, a dance and musical revue where she was a regular "Long-Legged Lovely", performing in ten shows weekly until May 2010. Soon after, she was awarded a star on the Palm Springs Walk of Stars.

In 2013, Kloss's autobiography entitled I'm Not in Kansas Anymore: Love Dorothy was published by Bear Manor Media.

References

Further reading

External links
 
 

1923 births
Living people
American female dancers
American dancers
21st-century American women